The Roman-Sardinian Wars (Latin: Bellum Sardum) were a series of conflicts which took place in Sardinia in a span of time between the 3rd century BC and the 1st century AD. These wars involved the Romans against the major indigenous tribes which inhabited Sardinia: the Ilienses (later Ioles or Diagesbes), the Balares and the Corsi of Sardinia (located in today's Gallura). The struggle against Sardinians in order to maintain control of the coastal cities occupied a significant part of the efforts of the Roman Republic and the Roman Empire.

The province, especially the mountainous interior of Sardinia (also known as Barbaria, "land of the Barbarians") was never completely pacified by the Romans. In contrast, the coasts of Sardinia, known as Romania ("land of the Romans") were significantly influenced by the Romans during their centuries of dominion. The Roman presence was eroded by the arrival of the Vandals; however, these new invaders were likewise unable to take control of the interior and consequently settled in the coastal cities for at least 80 years. The Byzantines then arrived in Sardinia, struggling with the peoples of Barbaria for a period, before finally signing a peace treaty with Hospiton, chief of the Ilienses.

References

Citations

See also
Sardinia and Corsica

3rd-century BC conflicts
2nd-century BC conflicts
1st-century BC conflicts
1st-century conflicts
Wars involving the Roman Republic
Wars involving the Roman Empire
3rd century BC in the Roman Republic
2nd century BC in the Roman Republic
1st century BC in the Roman Republic
1st century BC in the Roman Empire
1st century in the Roman Empire
History of Sardinia
Ancient Sardinia